is a passenger railway station in the city of Shimotsuma, Ibaraki Prefecture, Japan operated by the private railway company Kantō Railway.

Lines

Station layout
The station has one side platform and one island platform, connected to the station building by both a level crossing and a footbridge. The station is staffed.

Platforms

Adjacent stations

History
Shimotsuma Station was opened on 1 November 1913 as a station on the Jōsō Railroad, which became the Kantō Railway in 1965. The station building was rebuilt in 2005.

Passenger statistics
In fiscal 2017, the station was used by an average of 1734 passengers daily (boarding passengers only).

Surrounding area
Shimotsuma City Hall
 Shimotsuma Post Office

See also
 List of railway stations in Japan

References

External links

  Kantō Railway Station Information 

Railway stations in Ibaraki Prefecture
Railway stations in Japan opened in 1913
Shimotsuma, Ibaraki